Quah Jing Wen (born 20 December 2000) is a Singaporean professional swimmer who specialises in individual medley, butterfly and freestyle events.

Education
Quah was educated at Methodist Girls' School and Anglo-Chinese School (Independent), before graduating from Texas A&M University in 2021 with a bachelor's degree in biomedical science.

Swimming career
Quah Jing Wen clocked 2min 12.95sec and set an Under-17 200m butterfly Singaporean national record at the Neo Garden 13th Singapore National Swimming Championships, breaking Tao Li's record set in 2005.

Quah won the bronze in the 2015 SEA Games when making her debut in the 400m IM.

In 2017, Quah won 5 gold medals and a silver medal at the Commonwealth Youth Games, held in Nassau.  In the same year, she also won 5 gold medals in the 2017 SEA Games.

Personal life
Quah has an elder sister, Quah Ting Wen, and an elder brother, Quah Zheng Wen, who both are national swimmers of Singapore as well.

See also 
Swimming at the Southeast Asian Games

References 

2000 births
Living people
Singaporean female butterfly swimmers
Swimmers at the 2018 Asian Games
Asian Games bronze medalists for Singapore
Medalists at the 2018 Asian Games
Asian Games medalists in swimming
Southeast Asian Games medalists in swimming
Southeast Asian Games gold medalists for Singapore
Southeast Asian Games silver medalists for Singapore
Southeast Asian Games bronze medalists for Singapore
Competitors at the 2015 Southeast Asian Games
Competitors at the 2017 Southeast Asian Games
Competitors at the 2019 Southeast Asian Games
Competitors at the 2021 Southeast Asian Games
Singaporean female freestyle swimmers
Singaporean female medley swimmers
Methodist Girls' High School, Singapore alumni
Anglo-Chinese School alumni
Texas A&M Aggies women's swimmers
Swimmers at the 2022 Commonwealth Games
Commonwealth Games competitors for Singapore
21st-century Singaporean women